Sir John Yorke (1633-1663) was an English politician, who sat in the House of Commons as member for the Richmond constituency in the North Riding of Yorkshire from 1661 to 1663.

John Yorke was born at Gouthwaite in Nidderdale, then in the West Riding of Yorkshire, in 1633, the son of John Yorke (c.1592-1638) and Katharine Daniel.  At the age of 4 he inherited his father's estates in Nidderdale.  In 1658 he married Mary, daughter of Maulger Norton, his father's executor and MP for Richmond in 1640.  Through his marriage he acquired property in Richmond.  He was knighted at the Restoration court by Charles II in 1660.

He was elected member for Richmond in the Cavalier Parliament of 1661.  He became a friend of Lord Wharton, and was appointed to ten committees, but died near London on 3 April 1663.  He was buried in St Chad's Church, Middlesmoor in Nidderdale, where he is commemorated by an inscription in Latin.

John and Mary had one son, Thomas (born in 1658) and a daughter Mary, born in 1662.

References

Further reading 

1633 births
1663 deaths
People from Nidderdale
English MPs 1661–1679